Maleic hydrazide, often known by the brand name Fazor is a plant growth regulator that reduces growth through preventing cell division but not cell enlargement. It is applied to the foliage of potato, onion, garlic and carrot crops to prevent sprouting during storage. It can also be used to control volunteer potatoes that are left in the field during harvesting. It was first identified in the 1940s but was not used commercially in the United Kingdom until 1984. The banning of chlorpropham as a sprout suppressant in 2019 has led renewed interest in how maleic hydrazide can be used in potatoes.

References

Plant growth regulators